Tockholes is a civil parish in Blackburn with Darwen, Lancashire, England.  It contains 26 buildings that are recorded in the National Heritage List for England as designated listed buildings.   Of these, three are listed at Grade II*, the middle grade, and the others are at Grade II, the lowest grade.  Apart from the village of Tockholes, the parish is rural.  The great majority of the listed buildings are farmhouses and associated farm buildings.  Three of the other listed buildings are associated with the parish church, namely a sundial, a former school, and a lychgate, and the last is a structure over a well or spring in the grounds of the now-demolished Hollinshead Hall.

Key

Buildings

References

Citations

Sources

Buildings and structures in Blackburn with Darwen
Lists of listed buildings in Lancashire